As of 17 September 2015, Centre-South operates the following flights. However, most of them will stop flying from 1 October.

References

Centre-South